Oscar Abreu Mejia (born December 7, 1978) is a Dominican football goalkeeper who once played for C.D. Luis Ángel Firpo in El Salvador.

Mejía has appeared for the Dominican Republic national football team in 11 qualifying matches for FIFA World Cups.

International goals

References

External links

1978 births
Living people
Dominican Republic footballers
Dominican Republic international footballers
Long Island Rough Riders players
C.D. Atlético Marte footballers
C.D. Luis Ángel Firpo footballers
Expatriate soccer players in the United States
Expatriate footballers in El Salvador
Association football goalkeepers